The Tour of Oman is an annual professional road bicycle racing stage race held in Oman since 2010 as part of the UCI Asia Tour. It was scheduled to become part of the new UCI ProSeries in 2020, but both the 2020 and 2021 editions were cancelled due to the COVID-19 pandemic.

History
The race is classified as a 2.HC (as of 2012). The race is organized by the Amaury Sport Organisation, and was held for the first time between 14 and 19 February 2010. The race is a men's competition consisting of six stages. The race contains mainly flat stages, with some hillier parts.

During the race, the leader of the General Classification wears a red jersey, the leader of sprinter's points classification is denoted by a green jersey and best young rider by white. The race does not contain a mountains jersey. The most aggressive rider wears a white jersey with green and red polka-dots.

The inaugural edition of the race in 2010, consisted of 6 stages, beginning with a 16-lap criterium in Muscat Corniche and ending with an 18.6 km time trial, also in Muscat. Fabian Cancellara won this event after coming second in the final time trial to Edvald Boasson Hagen.

Past winners

General classification

Points classification

Young rider classification

Aggressive rider classification

Team classification

Classifications
As of the 2022 edition, the jerseys worn by the leaders of the individual classifications are:
  Red Jersey – Worn by the leader of the general classification.
  Green Jersey – Worn by the leader of the points classification.
  Gold Jersey – Worn by the most active rider.
  White Jersey – Worn by the best rider under 23 years of age on the overall classification.

References

External links

 
 
 Statistics at the-sports.org
 Stages at www.cyclingstage.com
 Tour of Oman at cqranking.com

 
Cycle races in Oman
UCI Asia Tour races
Recurring sporting events established in 2010
2010 establishments in Oman
Eddy Merckx
UCI ProSeries